Richard J. "Rich" Murray (born July 21, 1957) is a Minnesota politician serving as the mayor of Albert Lea, Minnesota, since 2023. From 2011 to 2013, he served as a member of the Minnesota House of Representatives, representing District 27A, which includes all or parts of Freeborn and Mower Counties.

Early life, education, and career
Murray graduated from Mankato State University, receiving his B.S. in business, and later attended the University of St. Thomas, earning his M.B.A. He also served in the U.S. Army.

Murray is also an investment advisor and small business owner of ISC Financial Advisors, based in Minneapolis and Albert Lea.

Minnesota House of Representatives

Elections
A Republican, Murray was elected to the House in 2010, unseating incumbent Representative Robin Brown by 57 votes after a recount. In 2012, he lost reelection to DFL nominee Shannon Savick by 653 votes.

Tenure
Murray was sworn in on January 4, 2011. He served in the 87th Minnesota legislature. He served on the Government Operations and Elections, the Jobs and Economic Development Finance, the State Government Finance, and the Transportation Policy and Finance committees.

Personal life
Murray is married to his wife, Sandy. They have 4 children and reside in Albert Lea. Active in his community and church through the years, Murray has been a member of the local Salvation Army Board, the Albert Lea Technical College Foundation Board, the Naeve Healthcare Foundation Board, the Southern Minnesota Judicial Ethics Committee, the Circle of Parenting Child Abuse Prevention Board, the local United Way, and local youth athletics and recreation programs.

References

External links 

 Rep. Murray Web Page
 Project Votesmart - Rep. Rich Murray Profile
 Rich Murray Campaign Web Site

1957 births
Living people
People from Albert Lea, Minnesota
Republican Party members of the Minnesota House of Representatives
21st-century American politicians